Kenneth Monroe Schultz (June 21, 1925 – December 1, 2003) was a Canadian professional hockey player who played for the Pittsburgh Hornets, Providence Reds, Hershey Bears. Washington Lions and Cleveland Barons in the American Hockey League.

External links
 

1925 births
2003 deaths
Canadian ice hockey centres